Wille and the Bandits are a British-based band who play a variety of different genres spanning across the blues, rock, Latin and folk styles. The band currently consists of Wille Edwards, Matthew Gallagher, Harry Mackaill and Tom Gilkes. To date, they have  released five studio albums and one live album.

History
Forming in 2010, Wille and The Bandits are band from Cornwall, UK taking their inspiration from a variety of artists such as Pearl Jam, Ben Harper and Jimi Hendrix. Additionally, the band have played at festivals such as Glastonbury, Isle of Wight, Greenman, Shambala and Greenbelt. The band was chosen as one of three top unsigned bands in the United Kingdom by the Daily Telegraph. Edwards is sponsored by Anderwood guitars and received his own signature Weissenborn from them.

The band were listed in the top ten must-see bands at Glastonbury 2014 by BBC Radio 1.

Both 2014 and 2015 saw Wille and The Bandits headline multiple shows in countries such as Germany, Switzerland, Holland, France, Belgium, Italy, Poland and Austria. The band were invited to perform on the German television show, Rockpalast.

Long serving members Matthew Brooks and Andrew Naumann both left the band at the end of 2019 for personal reasons.

Discography

Studio albums
Samsara (EP) 2007
New Breed 2010
Breakfree 2012
Grow 2013
Steal 2017
Paths 2019
When the World Stood Still 2022

Live albums
Live in Gouvy 2013

Members 
Wille Edwards – Lead Vocals, Guitar, Weissenborn, Lap Steel, Dobro
Matthew Gallagher – Keyboards, Guitar, Percussion, Backing Vocals
Harry Mackaill – Bass
Tom Gilkes – Drums, Percussion

References

External links
Wille and the Bandits Official Site

English blues musical groups
English rock music groups
English folk musical groups
Latin pop music groups
Musicians from Cornwall